The 20th Arizona State Legislature, consisting of the Arizona State Senate and the Arizona House of Representatives, was constituted in Phoenix from January 1, 1951, to December 31, 1952, during the first two years of John Howard Pyle's term as Governor of Arizona. The number of senators remained constant at 19, while the members of the house of representatives increased from 58 to 68. The Democrats controlled one hundred percent of the senate, while in the house the Democrats increased six seats and the Republicans gained four seats, giving the Democrats a 57–11 edge.

Sessions
The Legislature met for two regular sessions at the State Capitol in Phoenix. The first opened on January 8, 1951; and adjourned on March 18, while the second convened on January 14, 1952, and adjourned on March 27. There were two special sessions: the first convened on June 25, 1951, and adjourned sine die on June 29, 1951; while the second convened on July 30, 1952, and adjourned sine die on August 1, 1952.

State Senate

Members

The asterisk (*) denotes members of the previous Legislature who continued in office as members of this Legislature.

House of Representatives

Members 
The asterisk (*) denotes members of the previous Legislature who continued in office as members of this Legislature.

References

Arizona legislative sessions
1951 in Arizona
1952 in Arizona
1951 U.S. legislative sessions
1952 U.S. legislative sessions